The 1905 Stetson Hatters football team represented the private Stetson College in the sport of American football during the 1905 college football season. The team went undefeated. A game with Savannah scheduled for November 18 was cancelled. A game with the University of Florida in Lake City had also been scheduled to be played in Palatka.

Schedule

References

Stetson
Stetson Hatters football seasons
Stetson Hatters football